The 2009 Conference USA men's basketball tournament took place March 11–14, 2009, at the FedExForum in Memphis, Tennessee.

Bracket

Asterisk denotes game ended in overtime.

References

Tournament
Conference USA men's basketball tournament
Conference USA men's basketball tournament
Conference USA men's basketball tournament